Kent State University (KSU) is a public research university in Kent, Ohio. The university also includes seven regional campuses in Northeast Ohio and additional facilities in the region and internationally, located in Ashtabula, Burton, East Liverpool, Jackson Township, New Philadelphia, Salem, and Warren, Ohio, with additional facilities in Cleveland, Independence, and Twinsburg, Ohio; New York City, and Florence, Italy.

The university was established in 1910 as a normal school. The first classes were held in 1912 at various locations and in temporary buildings in Kent and the first buildings of the original campus opened the following year. During the late 1960s and early 1970s the university was known internationally for its student activism in opposition to U.S. involvement in the Vietnam War, due mainly to the Kent State shootings in 1970.

, Kent State was the third-largest university in Ohio with an enrollment of over 34,000 students in the eight-campus system and over 25,000 students at the main campus in Kent. Kent State offers over 300 degree programs, among them 250 baccalaureate, 40 associate, 50 master's, and 23 doctoral programs of study, which include such notable programs as nursing, business, history, library science, aeronautics, journalism, architecture, fashion design and the Liquid Crystal Institute. It is classified by the Carnegie Classification of Institutions of Higher Education among "R1: Doctoral Universities – very high research activity".

History

Early history

Kent State University was established in 1910 as an institution for training public school teachers. It was part of the Lowry Bill, which also created a sister school in Bowling Green, Ohio – now known as Bowling Green State University. It was initially known under the working name of the Ohio State Normal College At Kent, but was named Kent State Normal School in 1911 in honor of William S. Kent (son of Kent, Ohio, namesake Marvin Kent), who donated the  used for the original campus. The first president was John Edward McGilvrey, who served from 1912 to 1926. McGilvrey had an ambitious vision for the school as a large university, instructing architect George F. Hammond, who designed the original campus buildings, to produce a master plan. Classes began in 1912 before any buildings had been completed at the campus in Kent. These classes were held at extension centers in 25 cities around the region. By May 1913, classes were being held on the campus in Kent with the opening of Merrill Hall. The school graduated 34 students in its first commencement on July 29, 1914. In 1915, the school was renamed Kent State Normal College due to the addition of four-year degrees. By then additional buildings had been added or were under construction. Kent State's enrollment growth was particularly notable during its summer terms. In 1924, the school's registration for summer classes was the largest of any teacher-training school in the United States. In 1929, the state of Ohio changed the name to Kent State College as it allowed the school to establish a college of arts and sciences.

McGilvrey's vision for Kent was not shared by many others outside the school, particularly at the state level and at other state schools. His efforts to have the state funding formula changed created opposition, particularly from Ohio State University and its president William Oxley Thompson. This resulted in a 1923 "credit war" where Ohio State refused Kent transfer credits and spread to several other schools taking similar action. It was this development – along with several other factors – which led to the firing of McGilvrey in January 1926. McGilvrey was succeeded first by David Allen Anderson (1926–1928) and James Ozro Engleman from 1928 to 1938, though he continued to be involved with the school for several years as president emeritus and as head of alumni relations from 1934 to 1945. He was present in Columbus on May 17, 1935, when Kent native Governor Martin L. Davey signed a bill that allowed Kent State and Bowling Green to add schools of business administration and graduate programs, giving them each university status; the college's name was thus changed to Kent State University.

1940s to 1960s

From 1944 to 1963, the university was led by President George Bowman. During his tenure, the student senate, faculty senate and graduate council were organized. Although it had served Stark County from the 1920s, in 1946, the university's first regional campus, the Stark Campus, was established in Canton, Ohio. In the fall of 1947, Bowman appointed Oscar W. Ritchie as a full-time faculty member. Ritchie's appointment to the faculty made him the first African American to serve on the faculty at Kent State and also made him the first African American professor to serve on the faculty of any state university in Ohio. In 1977, the former Student Union, which had been built in 1949, was rededicated as Oscar Ritchie Hall in his honor. Recently renovated, Oscar Ritchie Hall currently houses the department of Pan-African Studies the Center of Pan-African Culture, the Henry Dumas Library, the Institute for African American Affairs, the Garrett Morgan Computer Lab and the African Community Theatre.

The 1950s and 1960s saw continued growth in both enrollment and in the physical size of the campus. Several new dorms and academic buildings were built during this time, including the establishment of additional regional campuses in Warren (1954), Ashtabula (1957), New Philadelphia (1962), Salem (1962), Burton (1964), and East Liverpool, Ohio (1965). In 1961, grounds superintendent Larry Wooddell and Biff Staples of the Davey Tree Expert Company released ten cages of black squirrels obtained from Victoria Park in London, Ontario, Canada, onto the Kent State campus. By 1964 their estimated population was around 150 and today they have spread in and around Kent and have become unofficial mascots of both the city and university. Since 1981, the annual Black Squirrel Festival is held every fall on campus.

In 1965, chemistry professor Glenn H. Brown established the Liquid Crystal Institute, a world leader in the research and development of the multibillion-dollar liquid crystal industry. James Fergason invented and patented the basic TN LCD in 1969 and ten liquid crystal companies have been spun off from the institute.

In 1967, Kent State became the first university to run an independent, student-operated Campus Bus Service. It was unique in that it provided jobs for students, receiving funding from student fees rather than bus fares. Campus Bus Service was the largest such operation in the country until it merged with the Portage Area Regional Transportation Authority in 2004. 1969 saw the opening of a new Memorial Stadium on the far eastern edge of campus and the closure and dismantling of the old Memorial Stadium.

Kent State shootings

Kent State gained international attention on May 4, 1970, when an Ohio Army National Guard unit fired at students during an anti-war protest on campus, killing four and wounding nine. The Guard had been called into Kent after several protests in and around campus had become violent, including a riot in downtown Kent and the burning of the ROTC building. The main cause of the protests was the United States' invasion of Cambodia during the Vietnam War. The shootings caused an immediate closure of the campus with students and faculty given just 60 minutes to pack belongings. Around the country, many college campuses canceled classes or closed for fear of similar violent protests. In Kent, schools were closed and the National Guard restricted entry into the city limits, patrolling the area until May 8. With the campus closed, faculty members came up with a variety of solutions—including holding classes in their homes, at public buildings and places, via telephone, or through the mail—to allow their students to complete the term, which was only a few weeks away at the time.

In 1971, the university established the Center for Peaceful Change, now known as the Center for Applied Conflict Management, as a "living memorial" to the students who had died. It offers degree programs in Peace and Conflict Studies and Conflict Resolution and is one of the earliest such programs in the United States.

In response to, and protest of, the Kent State shootings, Neil Young wrote the song "Ohio" which was performed by the folk rock group Crosby, Stills, Nash & Young. In remembrance of the tragedy, a group of professors and students created a website that features a map with oral histories and eyewitness accounts of the event.

1970s to 1980s

Also in 1970, the university opened its 12-story library, moving from the previous home of Rockwell Hall to the tallest building in Portage County. Dedicated in 1971, the library became a member of the Association of Research Libraries in 1973. Kent State joined with the University of Akron and Youngstown State University in establishing the Northeastern Ohio Universities College of Medicine in 1973. It was the world's first medical consortium. Today it includes a college of pharmacy and Cleveland State University as an additional consortium member.

Kent State was again in the national spotlight in 1977 when construction was set to begin on the Memorial Gym Annex, adjacent to the area where the Kent State shootings had occurred in 1970. Protesters organized a tent city in May, which lasted into July. Several attempts were made to block construction even after the end of the tent city, including an appeal to the United States Congress and the Department of the Interior to have the area declared a National Historic Landmark, which ended up being unsuccessful. Additional rallies were held that year, including one attended by Joan Baez on August 20. After several additional unsuccessful legal challenges, construction finally began on September 19 and was finished in 1979.

1990–present
In March 1991, Kent State once again made history by appointing Carol Cartwright as president of the university, the first female to hold such a position at any state university in Ohio. In 1994, Kent State was named a "Research University II" by the Carnegie Foundation. Beginning in the late 1990s, the university began a series of building renovations and construction, which included the complete renovation of the historic original campus, the construction of several new dormitories, a student recreation center, and additional academic buildings on the Kent Campus and at the regional campuses. In September 2010, the university announced its largest student body ever, with a total enrollment of 41,365. U.S. News & World Report's 2017 rankings put Kent State as tied for #188 for National Universities and tied for #101 in Top Public Schools. Kent State had a Fall 2015 acceptance rate of 85%.

Campuses

Kent State University is an eight-campus system in Northeast Ohio, with the main administrative center and largest campus in Kent.

Kent

Within the Kent State University system, the main campus is officially referred to as the "Kent Campus". The Kent Campus is a landscaped suburban environment in the Greater Akron area. There are also thousands of additional acres of bogs, marshes, and wildlife refuges adjacent to or near the campus. While the university's official mascot is Flash the golden eagle, the campus also has an unofficial mascot in the black squirrels, which were brought to Kent in 1961 and can be found on and around the campus. The campus is divided into North, South, and East sections but many areas have come to be referred to as Front Campus, Residential Campus, and Science Row. The main hub of activity and central point is the Student Center and Risman Plaza, which is adjacent to the twelve-story main library. The university also operated the 18-hole Kent State Golf Course until 2017, and currently operates Centennial Research Park just east of campus in Franklin Township and the  Kent State University Airport in Stow.

Regional campuses

In addition to the Kent Campus, there are seven regional campuses. The regional campuses provide open enrollment and are generally treated as in-house community colleges as opposed to the large university feel of the Kent Campus. Students at the regional campuses can begin any of Kent State's majors at their respective campus and each campus offers its own unique programs and opportunities that may or may not be available in Kent. Regional campuses include:

Ashtabula

The Ashtabula Campus was established in 1958 and is made up of four buildings: Main Hall, a library, the Bookstore Building, and the Robert S. Morrison Health and Science Building. It is on a  site in Ashtabula, just south of Lake Erie. The campus offers 27 associate and bachelor's degree programs of its own, with the nursing program being the largest. Approximately 75% of registered nurses working in Ashtabula County graduated with an associate degree in nursing from Kent State at Ashtabula.

East Liverpool

The East Liverpool Campus was established in 1965 from facilities formerly owned by the East Liverpool City School District, occupying a downtown site overlooking the Ohio River. It is composed of the Main Building, Memorial Auditorium, Mary Patterson Building, and a Commons area.

Geauga
The Geauga Campus is located on an  campus in Burton Township, just north of the village of Burton in Geauga County. It was established in 1964 and, has an enrollment of 1,276 students. Six associate degree and seven baccalaureate degree programs can be taken in their entirety at the campus. The Geauga Campus also administers the Regional Academic Center, a facility located in Twinsburg, Ohio.

Salem

Kent State at Salem is located in Salem Township, just south of the city of Salem. The  campus features a lake, outdoor classroom, and nature walk. Kent State University at Salem also owns and operates the "City Center" facility in the former home of Salem Middle School and Salem High School, in which administrative offices, classes, and student services are located.

Stark

The Stark Campus is the largest regional campus of Kent State University, with an enrollment of over 2,900 students . The campus serves around 11,000 students total each year through professional development and other academic coursework classes. The campus includes seven major buildings and a natural pond. Additionally, the Stark Campus includes the Corporate University and Conference Center, an advanced meeting, training, and events facility that is one of only ten such centers in the state of Ohio affiliated with the International Association of Conference Centers. The center also serves as a home to the Corporate University, which provides training and learning exercises for area businesses and organizations. Kent State University at Stark offers 24 complete degree programs, including three associate degree, 18 bachelor's degree, and three master's degree programs.

Trumbull
Kent State's Trumbull Campus is located just north of Warren in Champion Heights, Ohio, on SR 45 near the SR 5–SR 82 bypass. , it has an enrollment of 1,158 students. It offers programs in 170 majors at the freshman and sophomore level, as well as 18 certificates and 15 associate degree programs. In addition, there is upper division coursework for baccalaureate degree completion in nursing, justice studies, technology, business management, Theatre, and English, as well as general studies and psychology degrees. In 2004 the campus opened a  Technology Building that includes the Workforce Development and Continuing Studies Center.

Tuscarawas
The Tuscarawas Campus in New Philadelphia, Ohio offers 19 associate degrees, six bachelor's degrees, and the Master of Technology Degree. Bachelor's degrees are offered in business management, general studies, justice studies, industrial technology, nursing and technology 2+2. , it has an enrollment of 1,245 students. The Science and Advanced Technology Center provides  of laboratory and classroom space for science, nursing and workforce development.

Additional facilities
In addition to the eight campuses in northeast Ohio, Kent State operates additional facilities for programs in Cleveland, New York City, Florence, and Shanghai.

Florence Center

Formerly, the campus was housed in Palazzo dei Cerchi, a prestigious and ancient building located in the heart of Florence at the corner of Via della Condotta and Vicolo dei Cerchi next to the famous Piazza della Signoria and the birthplace of literary genius Dante Alighieri. Kent State acquired this facility in 2003 and undertook its complete renovation. The original exterior was maintained and reflects Florence as it was in the 13th century. The restoration carefully preserved the original structure while creating an efficient space for academic purposes, with an interior that houses state-of-the-art classrooms. After using the recently restorated Palazzo Vettori since January 2016, on April 17, 2016, the Kent State University Florence campus was officially moved from Palazzo dei Cerchi and Palazzo Bartolini Baldelli to Palazzo Vettori.

New York City Studio
The New York City Studio is located in the heart of New York City's Garment District. Surrounded by fabric and accessory shops, fashion showrooms, and designer studios; one-third of all clothing manufactured in the USA is designed and produced in this neighborhood. The District is home to America's world-renowned fashion designers, including Oscar de la Renta, Calvin Klein, Donna Karan, Liz Claiborne, and Nicole Miller. The facility is a state-of-the-art,  space and includes a 50-person lecture room, 12-station computer lab with instructor station, and a fashion design studio fully outfitted with professional equipment. The NYC studio gives Kent State students the advantage of working within the heart of the fashion, dance and theater industry.

Cleveland Urban Design Center
Kent State's Cleveland Urban Design Center is located at 1309 Euclid Ave in the downtown Cleveland Theater District neighborhood, just off of East 14th Street. The Urban Design Center was created in 1983 under the sponsorship of the Urban University Program, which supports the outreach and community service efforts of Ohio's state universities working in urban areas. Under its founding director, Foster Armstrong, the Center expanded on the existing outreach and public service activities of Kent State's architecture school, focusing primarily on historic preservation and the problems of Northeast Ohio's smaller towns and cities. In 2003, the CUDC began a collaboration with the Dresden University of Technology, Kent State's sister university in Germany, with a joint vision on the revitalization of the lower Cuyahoga Valley in Cleveland. Since then, there have been a number of faculty exchanges as the two universities seek to pool their expertise both to enhance students' experiences and to better serve their respective regions.

Academics

Admission

Admission to Kent State University is classified as "selective" by both the Carnegie Classification of Institutions of Higher Education and U.S. News & World Report. The Princeton Review gives Kent State an "Admissions Selectivity Rating" of 76. The college extends offers of admission to 87% of all applicants after holistic review that includes examination of academic rigor, performance and admissions test scores.

Of all matriculating students, the average high school GPA is 3.61. The interquartile range for SAT scores in math and reading are 500-600 and 500-610 respectively, while the range for ACT scores is 19–25.

Programs
Kent State has 12 academic colleges:

 College of Aeronautics and Engineering
 College of Architecture & Environmental Design
 College of Applied and Technical Studies
 College of the Arts
 College of Arts and Sciences 
 College of Business Administration
 College of Communication and Information
 College of Education, Health, and Human Services
 College of Nursing
 College of Podiatric Medicine
 College of Public Health
 Honors College

The university also has interdisciplinary programs in Biomedical Sciences, Digital Science, Financial Engineering, and Information Architecture and Knowledge Management. The College of Aeronautics and Engineering offers four aeronautics degrees; Flight Technology, Aviation Management, Air Traffic Control and Aeronautical Engineering, and holds courses via the Kent State University Airport. In 2008, the university began offering a flight training certificate program through an affiliation with Premier Flight Academy in Akron.

The Washington Program in National Issues, founded in 1973, is one of the longest running study away programs in Washington D.C. Housed in the College of Arts and Sciences, this program gives students the opportunity to live in Washington, get a closer look at public issues and policies, and work an internship of their choosing.

The Shannon Rodgers and Jerry Silverman School of Fashion Design and Merchandising has programs in Florence, Hong Kong, and New York City, and affiliations in Paris and London. It was named a top-ten fashion school in the United States by Runway Magazine.

The Liquid Crystal Institute, founded 1965, is engaged in the research and development of liquid crystal optoelectronic materials, technology, and consumer products in connection with the National Science Foundation as part of ALCOM.

The Hugh A Glauser School of Music offers degrees in music education, music performance, music theory and composition, ethnomusicology, chamber music, and a new minor in jazz studies. The School of Music is one of the few colleges in the U.S. that offer a BM, a MM, and a PhD in music education. The Kent/Blossom Music program partners with the Cleveland Orchestra each summer for its classical music festivals.

The School Psychology Program (SPSY) is accredited by APA and NASP. The program's graduates comprise about 18% of all SPSY professionals in Ohio. Kent is the only institution in Ohio to offer a degree in Library and Information Science, Kent is ranked 20th by U.S. News & World Report. Kent State has a complete undergraduate, master's, and doctoral sequence in translation and the only dual master's degree program in the nation.

Faculty, staff and students collaborate at The Institute for the Study and Prevention of Violence (ISPV). The Center for Peaceful Change, a response to the Kent State shootings of 1970, was established in 1971 "as a living memorial to the events of May 4, 1970." Now known as The Center for Applied Conflict Management (CACM), it developed one of the earliest conflict resolution undergraduate degree programs in the United States.

Kent State University Press
The university operates the Kent State University Press, which is located in the main library building and publishes 30 to 35 titles a year. It is a member of the Association of University Presses, which includes over 100 university-sponsored scholarly presses. The Press was established in 1965, and initially published literary criticism; in 1972 its publishing program was expanded to include regional studies and ethnomusicology. Further expansion began in 1985 when the Press began publishing works related to the American Civil War and Ohio history.

Student life

The university offers a large number of opportunities for student involvement at all its campuses, including student and professional associations, service organizations, performing ensembles, student publications, student government, and intramural and club athletics.

Performing arts
Through the Hugh A. Glauser School of Music and the School of Theatre and Dance, the university offers performance opportunities in the performing arts, including three concert bands (Wind Ensemble, Concert Band, and Communiversity Band), Athletic Bands (Marching Golden Flashes and Flasher Brass), three jazz ensembles (Jazz Ensemble I, Jazz Ensemble II, and Jazz Lab Band), six choral ensembles (Kent Chorus, KSU Chorale, Women's Chorus, Men's Coro Cantare, Gospel Choir, and Nova Jazz Singers), one orchestra (KSU Orchestra), World Music Ensembles, as well as theater and dance opportunities. The Trumbull, Stark, and Tuscarawas campuses have theatre seasons featuring student actors. Each regional campus also offers their own performing arts opportunities.

Student government
Kent State offers several student government options, the largest of which is the Undergraduate Student Government (USG), which represents students from all campuses of the university and has been in some form of operation since 1924. The current 25 person governing body was formed after the merger of the All-Campus Programming Board (ACPB) and the Undergraduate Student Senate (USS). USG is led by an executive director and is composed of eight directors, ten college senators, one senator for residence hall students, one senator for commuter and off-campus students, one senator for undergraduate studies, and 3 senators-at-large. USG oversees the USG Programming Board which hosts various concerts, comedians, and performers, as well as the USG Allocations Committee which disburses conference and programming funds to the over 250 registered student organizations on the Kent Campus. Elections for USG are held annually in March, and officers are typically inaugurated in late April. In addition to the USG, Kent State also has the Graduate Student Senate (GSS) and the Kent Interhall Council (KIC). KIC is for students who live in the on-campus residence halls and deals with policies and activities. Within the KIC is a programming board and individual councils for each residence hall.

Student media
 The Kent Stater, colloquially known as the "Stater", is a student newspaper publishing student and guests editorials Monday, Wednesday and Thursday during the fall and spring semesters and weekly as the Summer Kent Stater during the summer. Stater staff is entirely students, primarily in the journalism school. Most editors hold their positions for one semester.
 Black Squirrel Radio is Kent State's student-run radio station, which has nearly 120 students on its staff. The station streams constantly online and is also available through iTunes and on campus TV. The station plays urban, rock, and local music, and also broadcasts KSU basketball and football home games live.
 Fusion magazine is published twice a year by KSU students in print and on the Internet. The magazine strives to unify people of different backgrounds through education and awareness. Fusion addresses sexual minority issues within the general population using illustrative photo essays and in-depth feature articles.
 Uhuru Magazine is Kent State University's magazine dedicated to minority issues and topics and concentrates on African American issues and topics more specifically.
 Artemis Magazine is Kent State University's magazine dedicated to women's issues and topics.
 TV2 KSU is Kent State's student-run television station, produced solely by students with live Monday through Friday 5:30 pm news. Other student-created shows include Sports Corner; The Blurb, an entertainment news show; The Agenda, Role Call; talk shows and more, including public affairs programming and election coverage. TV2 KSU programming is available on Kent State University cable TV Channel 2.2, Portage County Time Warner Cable Channel 16 and on-demand online. HD Streaming and an online archive are available on KentWired.

Residential life

Kent State operates twenty-five on-campus residence halls, all of which are located on the main campus in Kent. Each hall is a part of a larger group, usually bound by a common name or a common central area. They are:
 Twin Towers: Beall and McDowell
 Tri-Towers: Koonce, Leebrick, Wright and Korb
 Eastway: Allyn, Clark, Fletcher, and Manchester. 
 New Front: Prentice, Verder, Dunbar, and Engleman
 Centennial Court: Six buildings lettered A - F
 Quad: Lake, Olson, Johnson, and Stopher

Dining halls are in Eastway, the Design Innovation Hub (known as the DI Hub), and Tri-Towers, as well as multiple locations in the Student Center. Each of the residence hall dining locations also houses small grocery stores where students may use their board plan.

Learning communities

Within the halls are 12 Living-Learning Communities based on area of study:
 Air Force ROTC, housed in Dunbar Hall
 Army ROTC, housed in Dunbar Hall
 Business Learning Community, housed in Prentice Hall
 College of Aeronautics and Engineering (CAE): Aeronautics, housed in Koonce Hall
 College of Arts and Sciences, housed in Wright Hall
 College of Communication and Information (CCI) Commons, housed in Olson Hall
 EXCEL: Exploratory Majors, housed in Lake Hall
 Education Health & Human Services Residential College (EHHS), housed in Manchester Hall
 Fine Arts Community, housed in Verder Hall
 Honors Halls, housed in Johnson and Stopher Halls
 Ida B. Wells/Atonkwa Village, housed in Wright Hall
 International Village Experience (IVE), Housed in Clark Hall
 LGBT, housed in Korb Hall

Social programs

4 Paws for Ability 
4 Paws for Ability University Program provides university students with an opportunity to foster and socialize service dogs-in-training before they begin their professional training at the 4 Paws for Ability facility in Xenia, Ohio. A chapter was founded at Kent State in August 2016 with three service dogs-in-training; it became an official organization a year later. The chapter and organization was founded by Maxwell Newberry. , 4 Paws for Ability Kent State has 25 dogs on campus at a time. However, the number of sitters, co-handlers, and volunteers is not capped. The chapter has approximately 325 volunteers on their e-mail list, about 30 sitters, and over 50 co-handlers. The organization shares custody of the small fenced-in discus area at the outdoor track along Johnston Drive. Discussion and plans began in late 2017 to create a separate field for the organization.

Autism services 
In recent years, Kent State has developed extensive services to support people with autism, with many of its programs nationally recognized in different areas. Neurotypical students who wish to be involved with these activities are paired with students with autism, and one sorority is directly involved with these services. In a 2018 story, the university's autism outreach coordinator told The Plain Dealer of Cleveland that about 30 autistic students were registered as such with the university, but estimated that close to 500 students with autism used the school's services. These services contributed to Kent State becoming the first NCAA Division I member to sign a recruit known to be diagnosed as autistic to a National Letter of Intent in a team sport in November of that year, when Kalin Bennett committed to play for the men's basketball team starting in 2019–20, making his debut with the team in November 2019.

Greek life
Greek life at Kent State is overseen by the Center for Student Involvement located in the Kent Student Center. Organizations belong to one of three governing councils, the Panhellenic Council, the Interfraternity Council and the Integrated Greek Council. Sorority houses are primarily located on Fraternity Drive located across the street from the main library and fraternity houses are located throughout the city of Kent. The university set aside land for the development of a Greek fraternity village in 2008, on land near the Student Recreation and Wellness Center. Sigma Nu built a new chapter house in 2008 on this land, but is now and empty house on fraternity circle. . Kent State's Greek life claims numerous famous and well-known figures in society including Lou Holtz, a brother of the Kent Delta Upsilon chapter and Drew Carey, a brother of the Kent Delta Tau Delta chapter.

Athletics

Kent State's athletic teams are called the Golden Flashes and the school colors are shades of navy blue and gold, officially "Kent State blue" and "Kent State gold". The university sponsors 16 varsity athletic teams who compete in the National Collegiate Athletic Association (NCAA) at the Division I level with football in the Football Bowl Subdivision (FBS). Kent State is a member of the Mid-American Conference (MAC) East division and has been a member of the conference since 1951. The university athletic facilities are mainly on campus, featuring the 25,319-seat Dix Stadium and the 6,327-seat Memorial Athletic and Convocation Center, one of the oldest arenas in Division I college basketball.

Through the 2014–2015 season, in MAC play, Kent State has won the Reese Cup for best men's athletic program eight times, winning in 2000, 2002, 2006, 2009, 2010, 2011, 2012, and 2013. The Flashes have also won the Jacoby Cup for best women's athletic program eight times, winning in 1989, 1996, 1997, 1999, 2004, 2005, 2010, and 2014. In 2002 the Men's Basketball team advanced to NCAA "Elite Eight", while the baseball team, women's basketball, gymnastics, men's golf, and women's golf teams have won numerous MAC titles and advanced to NCAA tournament play.

Some notable athletic alumni include: Alabama Crimson Tide head football coach and five-time national champion head coach Nick Saban, former Missouri Tigers head football coach Gary Pinkel, 2003 British Open Champion and current PGA member Ben Curtis, former New York Yankees catcher Thurman Munson, Thomas Jefferson 1984 200m Olympic bronze medalist, former Pittsburgh Steelers Pro Football Hall of Fame linebacker and four-time Super Bowl champion Jack Lambert, Pittsburgh Steelers linebacker and two-time Super Bowl champion James Harrison, ESPN Analyst and former college football national champion head coach Lou Holtz, New England Patriots Wide Receiver and Super Bowl champion Julian Edelman, former San Diego/Los Angeles Chargers All-Pro tight end Antonio Gates (who played basketball at KSU, not football), former Cleveland Browns and Indianapolis Colts All Pro return specialist Joshua Cribbs, former San Diego Padres pitcher Dustin Hermanson, Tampa Bay Rays pitcher Andy Sonnanstine, Los Angeles Dodgers pitcher Matt Guerrier. pitcher Joe Crawford, New York Mets.

Affiliated media 

Kent State owns public radio station WKSU, the NPR member for both the Akron metropolitan area and Greater Cleveland. WKSU was established by the university in 1950 as an extension of the Kent State Radio Workshop, which up to that point produced scripted radio programs for broadcast on commercial radio stations dating back to 1935. Originally student operated, WKSU joined NPR in 1973 and subsequently evolved into a conventional public radio outlet. Since 2021, Ideastream Public Media has operated WKSU and its regional network of four satellite stations in Wooster, New Philadelphia, Thompson and Norwalk, all of which remain owned by the university (a fifth station, WCPN in Lorain, is owned directly by Ideastream). Ideastream also hosts an internship program for Kent State journalism students.

Notable alumni

Kent State counts 227,000 living alumni . It has produced a number of individuals in the entertainment industry including comedian and current Price is Right host Drew Carey, comedian and talk show host Arsenio Hall, Steve Harvey, actors John de Lancie, Michael Keaton, and Ray Wise, actresses Alaina Reed Hall and Alice Ripley, Phenomenon star Angela Funovits, boxing promoter Don King, 30 Rock producer Jeff Richmond, and That 70s Show creator Bonnie Turner. Musicians from Kent State include several members of the band Devo, which was formed at Kent State in 1973, including Mark Mothersbaugh, Bob Lewis, and Gerald Casale. Additional musicians include singers Chrissie Hynde, Jeff Timmons of 98 Degrees, Debra Byrd of American Idol, guitarist Joe Walsh, and drummer Chris Vrenna.

In politics and government, several politicians in Ohio attended Kent State including former judge and United States Representative Robert E. Cook, former minority leader C.J. Prentiss, current United States House of Representatives member Betty Sutton, former representative, Lieutenant Governor, and Governor Nancy Hollister, and Supreme Court of Ohio justice Terrence O'Donnell. Other politicians include Allen Buckley of Georgia, Ohio politician Jeffrey Dean, Pennsylvania state representative Allen Kukovich, and George Petak of Wisconsin. Politician activists from Kent State include anti-war activist Alan Canfora and former Students for a Democratic Society leaders Ken Hammond and Carl Oglesby.

Literary and journalism alumni include Funky Winkerbean and Crankshaft writer Tom Batiuk, Captain Underpants comic book creators Sean McArdle and Jon Judy, author Dav Pilkey, and columnists Connie Schultz and Regina Brett. Poet Laureate of the state of Maryland writer and educator Michael Glaser.

Television journalism alumni include CNN anchor Carol Costello, Cleveland news anchors Ted Henry, Wayne Dawson, sportscaster Jeff Phelps, and ESPN Dream Job winner Dave Holmes.

A number of professional athletes are Kent State alumni including current WWE wrestlers Dolph Ziggler and Dana Brooke, National Football League players Julian Edelman, James Harrison, Josh Cribbs, and Usama Young. Former NFL players include Don Nottingham, Cedric Brown, Bob Hallen, Abdul Salaam, Jack Lambert, and Antonio Gates, along with Canadian Football League standouts Jay McNeil, Tony Martino, and Canadian Football Hall of Fame and former Kent State football head coach Jim Corrigall. College football coaches Nick Saban, Gary Pinkel, and Lou Holtz are also Kent State alumni.

Major League Baseball players to come from Kent State include current players Emmanuel Burriss, Matt Guerrier, Andy Sonnanstine and Dirk Hayhurst. Past MLB players include Gene Michael, Rich Rollins, Dustin Hermanson, Steve Stone, and Thurman Munson. Additional athletic alumni include Canadian professional golfers Corey Conners, Mackenzie Hughes, Jon Mills, Taylor Pendrith and Ryan Yip, American professional golfer Ben Curtis, and Olympians Betty-Jean Maycock in gymnastics and Gerald Tinker in track and field.

Notes

References

Further reading

External links

 

 
Education in Portage County, Ohio
Public universities and colleges in Ohio
Kent, Ohio
Buildings and structures in Portage County, Ohio
Tourist attractions in Portage County, Ohio
Educational institutions established in 1910
1910 establishments in Ohio